Longchaeus achates is a species of sea snail, a marine gastropod mollusk in the family Pyramidellidae, the pyrams and their allies.

Description
The shell is stout, shining, milk-white, with irregular, flammulated spots of rust color, which are densest about one-third of the distance between the sutures anterior to the summits, where they form an almost continuous band. (The whorls of the protoconch are decollated.) The ten whorls of the teleoconch are weakly rounded, slightly shouldered and faintly crenulated at the summit. They are marked by lines of growth, which are somewhat variable in strength, the strongest being on the side of the crenulations. The sutures are well impressed. The periphery is marked by a moderately strong, spiral sulcus. The base of the shell is rather long, and is crossed by many lines of growth. The aperture is elongate-pyriform, and rather compressed laterally. The posterior angle is acute. The outer lip is thin. The columella is short, and heavy. It is bounded by a low, strong basal fasciole, bearing three oblique folds, the posterior one of which is lamellar and situated a little anterior to the insertion of the columella; the other two folds are much less strongly developed and more oblique. The parietal wall is covered with a thin callus.

Distribution
The type species was found in the Pacific Ocean off the Gulf of California.

References

External links
 Gould, A. A. (1853). Descriptions of shells from the Gulf of California and the Pacific coasts of Mexico and California. Boston Journal of Natural History. 6: 374-407, pls 14-16

Pyramidellidae
Gastropods described in 1853